Torngat Mountains is a provincial electoral district for the House of Assembly of Newfoundland and Labrador, Canada. As of 2011 there are 2,130 eligible voters living within the district. The district takes its name from the Torngat Mountains.

Progressive Conservative Lela Evans was elected as the Member of the House of Assembly (MHA) for this district in the 2019 general election defeating Liberal incumbent Randy Edmunds. Evans was re-elected in 2021. On October 25, 2021, Evans left the PC Party to sit as an Independent in the House of Assembly. On March 7, 2022, Evans joined the NDP.

The district contains a large indigenous population, including the Inuit self-governing territory of Nunatsiavut, as well as the Naskapi community of Natuashish which is a federal reserve. The Voisey's Bay nickel mine, near Nain, is also in the district.

All six indigenous communities in the district are inaccessible by road and may be reached only by air or sea.

Members of the House of Assembly
The district has elected the following Members of the House of Assembly:

Election results

References

External links 
Website of the Newfoundland and Labrador House of Assembly

Newfoundland and Labrador provincial electoral districts